Constance Vella (1687–1759) was a major Maltese philosopher who specialised mainly in physics, logic, cosmology, and metaphysics. Vella's speciality is that, despite being a Scholastic, he was not an Aristotelic-Thomist one (as most of the well-known mediaeval philosophers are), but rather an Aristotelic-Scotist philosopher, that is more in the line of John Duns Scotus.

Life
Vella was born at Valletta, Malta, and joined the Franciscan Order, probably as a teenager. He was one of the best professors of philosophy whom the Franciscan ever had at their College of Philosophy and Literature at Rabat, Malta. He lectured there between 1712 and 1715. Amongst his most talented students there was John Constance Parnis. In fact, Vella was a kind of master with a school of disciples who not only followed his intellectual endeavours but also continued to teach his doctrines after his death. Vella even lectured successfully in Sicily, where he was also renowned as an endowed preacher.

In 1729, Vella was chosen as Provincial Minister of the Franciscan Province of Sicily and Malta. In Malta, he was also signed up as Sinodal Examiner, and worked under bishops Paul Alpheran de Bussan, and Bartolomeo Rull. In 1744, the former bishop further appointed Vella as Co-Visitor for the diocese of Malta. He was held in very high esteem both as an administrator as well as a philosopher. He died on November 1, 1759.

Extant work
Vella's most representative work in philosophy is a three-volume opus called Scoticæ Philosophiæ (Scotist Philosophy), composed between 1712 and 1715. Two identical copies of the manuscript exist, which for such a mediaeval document is a unique rather than a rare occurrence. One copy is held at the archives of the Franciscan friars in Valletta, Malta, and the other at the archives of the Archbishop's Seminary at Rabat, Malta (here marked as MS. 19). Together the three volumes have a staggering 1,926 back to back folios.

Volume I, containing 580 back to back folios, has just one Tractatus (or studies), entitled De Logica (On Logic), which is of course about Aristotelian logic. Volume II, made up of 615 back to back folios, includes two Tractatus (or studies), one, In Octo Aristotelis Libros De Physico Auditu (On the Eight Books of Aristotle on Physics), and the other, De Cælo et Mundo (On the Heavens and the Earth). The former deals with Aristotle’s physics, of course, and the latter with Aristotelian cosmology. Volume III comprises 731 back to back folios. It contains five Tractatus (or studies), which are the following: De Generatione et Corrupione (On Coming-To-Be and Passing Away), De Meteoris (On Meteors), De Anima (On the Soul), Compendiaria Notitia eorum quæ Mirabilem Humani Corporis Structuram Componunt (A Compendium of Information concerning Parts which Form the Marvellous Structure of the Human Body), and Tractatus in XII Aristotelis Stagirite Libros Metaphysicorum (Study on the 12th Book of Aristotle the Stagirite’s ‘Metaphysics’).

Other extant works of Vella are of a theological nature. They include Tractatus in Tertium Librum Sententiarum (A Study on the Third Book of Peter Lombard’s ‘Sentences’; 1715), Selva Morale (An Assorted Study of Morals; undated), and Selva Santorale (An Assorted Study of Liturgical Rites; undated).

Appreciation
All of Vella’s works contain a lattice of subtle philosophical arguments which make them masterworks of a first class philosopher. He spares no effort to be consistent, thorough, perfectly clear, and illuminating.

Apart from the Compendium, all the other works of Vella are basically commentaries on the respective works of Aristotle from the point of view of a Scotist Scholastic. Throughout he makes his position clear while demonstrating his disagreement with the prevailing Thomist interpretation.

In terms of novelty and originality, on the other hand, the Compendium is the most interesting. As its title suggests, Vella deals with the physical constitution of the human body. He takes each physical organ on its own, explains their nature and function, and examines their relationship to other organs and to the body as a whole. He particularly demonstrates an acute appreciation of things physical in general, and also of their organisational structure.

Unfortunately, Vella is not very known amongst philosophy academics and intellectuals. Like almost all the other mediaeval Maltese philosophers, his philosophy is still wholly inaccessible. The reason being that his works have never been transliterated from their original manuscript form, and neither have they been translated, in whole or in part, into any modern language. Thus, as yet they remain unread and unstudied by contemporary scholars.

This is indeed a great pity. For Vella surely merits attentive study and much larger appreciation, not only in a historical sort of way, but academically and philosophically. Together with John Matthew Rispoli, he might well be a long neglected gem of fascinating intellectual stimulation.

See also
Philosophy in Malta

References

Sources
 Mark Montebello, Il-Ktieb tal-Filosofija f’Malta (A Source Book of Philosophy in Malta), PIN Publications, Malta, 2001.

18th-century Maltese philosophers
Scholastic philosophers
People from Valletta
1687 births
1759 deaths